KCVI (101.5 FM, "K-Bear 101") is a commercial radio station in Idaho Falls, Idaho, broadcasting to the East Idaho area. KCVI airs an active rock music format. The station is owned and operated by Riverbend Communications.

Current on-air staff

Viktor Wilt
Peaches
Howie Rock
Lou Brutus
Jade Davis

Former on-air staff

Piper Phynnie
Ian
Brad Royal
Phyllis

References

External links
KCVI official website

CVI
Active rock radio stations in the United States